Luciobrotula is a genus of cusk-eels.

Species
There are currently six recognized species in this genus:
 Luciobrotula bartschi H. M. Smith & Radcliffe, 1913
 Luciobrotula brasiliensis J. G. Nielsen, 2009
 Luciobrotula coheni J. G. Nielsen, 2009
 Luciobrotula corethromycter Cohen, 1964 
 Luciobrotula lineata (Gosline, 1954)
 Luciobrotula nolfi Cohen, 1981

References

Ophidiidae
Ray-finned fish genera